In the state of Victoria, Australia, the Victorian Essential Learning Standards (VELS) is the curriculum framework for Preparatory to Year 10 school levels, which replaced the Curriculum and Standards Framework II (CSF 2) in 2006. Students starting Year 11 normally proceed to complete the Victorian Certificate of Education (VCE), but other education options are available. VELS was superseded by the Australian Curriculum AusVELS in 2013.

Breakdown of the VELS
The VELS is a curriculum framework providing a set of areas for teachers to teach. Like the Curriculum and Standards Framework (CSF) and the CSF II, the VELS has six levels, with a general expectation that each level be completed in two years of schooling, with the exception of Level 1, completed in the first year of Primary schooling, known as "Prep", as follows: 

Primary School Level

Level 1 - Preparatory
Level 2 - Years 1 and 2
Level 3 - Years 3 and 4
Level 4 - Years 5 and 6

Secondary School Level

Level 5 - Years 7 and 8 
Level 6 - Years 9 and 10

The following is a list of teaching areas in the VELS (domains), which are sorted further into dimensions. Each domain belongs to one of three strands: Physical, Personal and Social Learning, Discipline-based Learning or Interdisciplinary Learning. The idea is for these three strands to be woven together to give a balanced education so that students will succeed in further education, work and life. The three strands are represented graphically by a triple-helix inspired diagram.

Physical, Personal and Social Learning

Health and Physical Education
Standards at levels 1,2,3,4,5 and 6

Dimensions:
Movement and physical activity 
Health knowledge and promotion

Interpersonal Development
Standards at levels 1,2,3,4,5 and 6

Dimensions:
Building social relationships
Working in teams

Personal Learning 
Standards at levels 3,4,5,6

Dimensions:
The individual learner
Managing personal learning

Civics and Citizenship
Standards at levels 3, 4, 5 and 6. Civics and Citizenship aims to teach students what it means to be citizens in a democracy.

Dimensions:
Civil knowledge and understanding: Concepts such as political and legal systems are introduced, and basic history relating to Australian politics is covered. 
Community engagement: This is a hands-on approach to developing skills related to living and existing in a community. Students will engage in group activities, and make decisions while applying their knowledge of the concepts of democracy and the rules of governance. Students learn to look at issues objectively and give opinions on local and global issues.

Discipline-based Learning

The Arts
Standards at levels 1, 2, 3, 4, 5 and 6

Dimensions:
Creating and making
Exploring and responding

English
Standards at levels 1,2,3,4,5 and 6. 

Dimensions:
Reading
Writing
Speaking and listening

The Humanities
Standards at levels 3, 4, 5 and 6

The Humanities discipline is organised into four domains: 

The Humanities – (Levels 1–3) 

Dimensions:
Humanities knowledge and understanding
Humanities skills

The Humanities – Economics (Levels 4–6) 

Dimensions:
Economics knowledge and understanding
Economics reasoning and interpretation 

The Humanities – Geography (Levels 4–6) 

Dimensions:
Geographical knowledge and understanding
Geospatial skills

The Humanities – History (Levels 4–6)
 
Dimensions:
Historical knowledge and understanding
Historical reasoning and interpretation

LOTE (Languages other than English)

Dimensions:
Communicating in a language other than English 
Intercultural knowledge and language awareness.

LOTE has two pathways:

Pathway 1 - for students who begin learning a language in primary school and continue to study the same language to Year 10. 

Standards at levels 4, 5 and 6

Pathway 2 - for students who begin learning a language in Year 7. 

Standards at levels 5 and 6

Mathematics
Standards at levels 1,2,3,4,5 and 6

Dimensions:
Number
Space
Measurement, chance and data
Structure
Working mathematically

Science
Standards at levels 3, 4, 5 and 6

Dimensions:
Science knowledge and understanding 
Science at work

Interdisciplinary Learning

Communication
Standards at levels 4, 5 and 6.
 
The Communication domain focuses on developing students who communicate clearly and confidently both at school and for further education and life.

Dimensions:
Listening, viewing and responding: Students learn how to listen, view and respond to content. Students are taught conventions in communication, strategies in communication and familiarity with different forms of content presentation. 
Presenting: Students are taught how to present information in a coherent and appropriate manner for the situation, and to understand formats of presentation.

Design, Creativity and Technology
Standards at levels 3, 4, 5 and 6. 

Design, Creativity and Technology aims to encourage students to think laterally and openly to design, produce and evaluate solutions to problems. 

Dimensions:
Investigating and designing: Students identify problems and develop and use design briefs (summaries of the problem and specifications). Students research and investigate relevant information about the problem and resources (for example materials, tools and equipment), processes, and represent and plan production of possible solutions.
Producing: Students produce their solution for the problem, learning how to safely use tools, equipment and materials (such as food, wood, metal, plastics and textiles) and electrical and/or mechanical components to make a system.
Analysing and evaluating: This involves students testing and evaluating the effectiveness of the solution they have produced and the impacts of their own and others’ products.

Information and Communications Technology
Standards at levels 2, 3, 4, 5 and 6

Dimensions:
ICT for visualising thinking 
ICT for creating 
ICT for communicating

Thinking Processes
Standards at levels 3, 4, 5 and 6

Dimensions:
Reasoning, processing and inquiry 
Creativity
Reflection, evaluation and metacognition

Intended aims of the VELS
A curriculum that recognises what students need to know and be able to do to succeed in the world such as managing themselves as individuals and in relation to others; understanding the world in which they live; and acting effectively in that world.
To provide clearer assessment and reporting strategies to better inform parents about student achievement.

Changes to Victorian Standards
The VELS is the third program to be introduced into Victoria in the past decade, with the CSF in 1995 and the CSF II in 2000. It builds on the CSF recognising that the CSF had many strengths. The CSF remains as a good curriculum resource to help teachers develop teaching and learning programs in the VELS.

See also
Curriculum and Standards Framework
Curriculum framework
Victorian Curriculum and Assessment Authority

References

External links
Victorian Curriculum Assessment Authority: VELS
Department of Education and Early Childhood Development, Victoria - Curriculum
SOFWeb - Blueprint for Government Schools
Victorian Government Schools Reference Guide: VELS
Victorian Commercial Teachers Association: VELS News

Education in Victoria (Australia)